Eisenia may refer to:

 Eisenia (alga), a brown alga genus
 Eisenia (annelid), an earthworm genus